Deep River Township is a township in 
Poweshiek County, Iowa, USA.

References

Poweshiek County, Iowa
Townships in Iowa